Far View Airport  is an airport located one nautical mile (2 km) south of the central business district of Hiram, a village in Portage County, Ohio, United States.

Facilities and aircraft 
It has one runway designated 9/27 with a 2,170 by 80 ft (661 x 24 m) turf surface. For the 12-month period ending December 11, 2006, the airport had 3,334 aircraft operations, an average of 277 per month, all of which were general aviation.

References

External links 
 

Airports in Ohio
Buildings and structures in Portage County, Ohio